Storm Sanders and John Peers defeated Kirsten Flipkens and Édouard Roger-Vasselin in the final, 4–6, 6–4, [10–7] to win the mixed doubles tennis title at the 2022 US Open.

Desirae Krawczyk and Joe Salisbury were the reigning champions, but Salisbury did not participate this year. Krawczyk partnered Neal Skupski, but lost in the second round to Caty McNally and William Blumberg.

Seeds

Draw

Finals

Top half

Bottom half

Other entry information

Wild cards

Protected ranking

Alternates

Withdrawals
  Alizé Cornet /  Nicolas Mahut → replaced by  Erin Routliffe /  Andreas Mies

References

External links
Main draw

US Open - Mixed Doubles
US Open - Mixed Doubles
Mixed Doubles
US Open (tennis) by year – Mixed doubles